Høgni Zachariasen (born 26 August 1982) is a Faroese international footballer who plays club football for ÍF Fuglafjørður, as a midfielder.

He made his international debut for the Faroe Islands national football team in 2010.

References

External links

1982 births
Living people
People from Fuglafjørður
Faroese footballers
Faroe Islands international footballers
Association football midfielders